Evarcha vittula is a jumping spider species in the genus Evarcha that lives in South Africa.

References

Endemic fauna of South Africa
Salticidae
Spiders of South Africa
Spiders described in 2011
Taxa named by Wanda Wesołowska